Danda is a punctuation character (।) used in the Devanāgarī script to mark the end of a sentence.

Danda may also refer to:

 Daṇḍa (Hindu punishment), punishments for criminal activity in Hindu law
 Danda Garhwa, an administrative block of Garhwa district, Jharkhand state, India
 Danda Kingdom, a frequently featured region in Hindu mythology
 Danda Mountain, in Taiwan
 Danda (novel), a book by Nkem Nwankwo
 Khar Danda, a fishing village located in Mumbai, India
 Walking stick (Sanskrit daṇḍa), a stick used to facilitate walking

People with the name
 Bronislav Danda (1930–2015), Czech ice hockey player
 Danda Mohamed Kondeh, Sierra Leonean economist and politician
 Mahamadou Danda (born 1951), Nigerien politician and Prime Minister of Niger
 Danda (footballer) (born 1962), Rosângela Rocha, Brazilian footballer

See also
 
 Tanda (disambiguation)
 Dandi (disambiguation)